Unique Business News is a satellite cable news channel operated by Unique Satellite TV in Taiwan. Unique Business News is the first local professional financial news network in Taiwan, which provides 24/7 news and global perspectives.

See also
Media of Taiwan

References

External links
 UBN official website

Television stations in Taiwan
24-hour television news channels in Taiwan
Television channels and stations established in 1994
Taiwan Broadcasting System
Mass media in Taipei
Taiwan Television